The women's 3000 metre relay in short track speed skating at the 1998 Winter Olympics took place on 17 February at the White Ring.

Results

Semifinals
The semifinals were held on 17 February. The top two teams in each semifinal qualified for the A final, while the third and fourth place teams advanced to the B Final.

Semifinal 1

Semifinal 2

Finals
The four qualifying teams competed in Final A, while four others raced in Final B.

Final A

Final B

References

Women's short track speed skating at the 1998 Winter Olympics
Women's events at the 1998 Winter Olympics